The 1999–2000 Liga Indonesia Premier Division (known as the Liga Bank Mandiri for sponsorship reasons) was the sixth season of the Liga Indonesia Premier Division, the top division of Indonesian football. The season began on 7 November 1999 and ended on 23 July 2000. The league was made up of 28 clubs. PSM won the title after beating Pupuk Kaltim 3–2 in the final.

This season was marred with the death of Persebaya's Eri Irianto on 3 April 2000, after collapsing following a heart attack on the pitch during a league match against PSIM Yogyakarta.

Teams

Team changes

Relegated from Premier Division 

 Persiba
 Persikabo
 Persita

Promoted to Premier Division 

 Indocement Cirebon
 Persijatim
 PSPS

Name changes 

 Pelita Bakrie changed their name to Pelita Solo following their relocation to Surakarta.

Stadiums and locations

First stage

West Division

East Division

Second stage

Group A

Group B

Knockout stage

Semifinals

Final

Awards

Top scorer
 Bambang Pamungkas (Persija) 24 goals.

Best player
 Bima Sakti (PSM)

References

External links
Indonesia - List of final tables (RSSSF)

Indonesian Premier Division seasons
1999–2000 in Indonesian football
Indonesia
1999 in Asian football
2000 in Asian football
Top level Indonesian football league seasons